We Play Endlessly is a compilation album by the post-rock group Sigur Rós. It was released on 31 January 2009 in the UK as a free covermount with The Independent national newspaper.

It comprises a selection of songs from previous EPs and albums released after the band signed with EMI's owned label Parlophone:

 "Hoppípolla", "Sæglópur" and "Heysátan" are taken from Takk... (2005)
 "Inní mér syngur vitleysingur", "Gobbledigook" and "Fljótavík" are taken from Með suð í eyrum við spilum endalaust (2008)
 "Í Gær" and "Hafsól" are taken from Hvarf/Heim (2007)
 "Ti Ki" is taken from Ba Ba Ti Ki Di Do (2004)

Track listing
"Hoppípolla" – 4:26
"Inní mér syngur vitleysingur" – 4:05
"Sæglópur" – 7:20
"Gobbledigook" – 3:05
"Í Gær" – 6:23
"Fljótavík" – 3:49
"Hafsól" – 9:46
"Heysátan" – 4:09
"Ti Ki" – 8:49

References

2009 compilation albums
Sigur Rós albums
The Independent